Cetiedil is a vasodilator and an anti-sickling agent.

References 

Thiophenes
Carboxylate esters
Azepanes